Thomas Johansson was the defending champion.

Mario Ančić won the title, beating Johansson 7–5, 7–6(7–2) in the final.

Seeds

Draw

Finals

Top half

Bottom half

References

 Main Draw
 Qualifying Draw

St. Petersburg Open
2006 ATP Tour
2006 in Russian tennis